Drummondia is a genus of haplolepideous mosses (Dicranidae) in the monotypic family Drummondiaceae.

The genus name of Drummondia is in honour of Octavio de Almeida Drummond (1912 - 2001), who was a Brasilian botanist (Mycology) and phytopathologist in Agronomy.

The genus was circumscribed by Augusto Chaves Batista and Heraldo da Silva Maia in Publ. Inst. Mic. Univ. Recife Vol.224 on page 4 in 1963.

References

Moss genera
Bryopsida